The 2014 Ms. Olympia contest 
is an IFBB professional bodybuilding competition and part of Joe Weider's Olympia Fitness & Performance Weekend 2014
was held on September 19, 2014, at the South Hall in the Las Vegas Convention Center in Winchester, Nevada and in the Orleans Arena at The Orleans Hotel and Casino in Paradise, Nevada. It was the 35th Ms. Olympia competition held. Other events at the exhibition include the 212 Olympia Showdown, Mr. Olympia, Fitness Olympia, Figure Olympia, Bikini Olympia, Women's Physique Showdown, and Men's Physique Showdown contests.

Results
1st - Iris Kyle
2nd - Alina Popa
3rd - Debi Laszewski
4th - Alana Shipp
5th - Yaxeni Oriquen-Garcia
6th - Anne Freitas
7th - Sheila Bleck
8th - Jennifer Sedia
9th - Maria Rita Bello
10th - Margie Martin
11th - Christine Envall
12th - Lisa Giesbrecht
13th - Simone Oliveira

Comparison to previous Olympia results:
Same - Iris Kyle
Same - Alina Popa
Same - Debi Laszewski
-1 - Yaxeni Oriquen-Garcia
+3 - Anne Freitas
-1 - Sheila Bleck
+2 - Jennifer Sedia
+2 - Maria Rita Bello
+1 - Lisa Giesbrecht

Scorecard

Attended
17th Ms. Olympia attended - Yaxeni Oriquen-Garcia
16th Ms. Olympia attended - Iris Kyle
6th Ms. Olympia attended - Debi Laszewski
4th Ms. Olympia attended - Sheila Bleck and Alina Popa
3rd Ms. Olympia attended - Anne Freitas
2nd Ms. Olympia attended - Maria Rita Bello, Lisa Giesbrecht, and Jennifer Sedia
1st Ms. Olympia attended - Christine Envall, Margaret Martin, Simone Oliveira, and Alana Shipp  
Previous year Olympia attendees who did not attend - Jennifer Abshire, Juanita Blaino, Brigita Brezovac, Tina Chandler, Monique Jones, Tammy Jones, and Cathy LeFrançois

Notable events
This was Iris Kyle's 10th overall Olympia win, thus breaking her own previous world record of nine overall Olympia wins. This makes her the most successful professional bodybuilder in the history of both male and female professional bodybuilding. This was also Iris's 9th consecutive Ms. Olympia win, thus surpassing Ronnie Coleman and Lee Haney record of eight consecutive Olympia wins.
Iris Kyle announced after her 10th overall Olympia win that she will be retiring from bodybuilding.
The song played during the posedown was Stronger by Kanye West.

2014 Ms. Olympia Qualified

Points standings

 In the event of a tie, the competitor with the best top five contest placings will be awarded the qualification. If both competitors have the same contest placings, than both will qualify for the Olympia.

See also
 2014 Mr. Olympia

References

External links
Ms. Olympia homepage

2014 in bodybuilding
Ms. Olympia
Ms. Olympia
History of female bodybuilding
Ms. Olympia 2014